The 1982 Preakness Stakes was the 107th running of the $300,000 Grade 1 Preakness Stakes thoroughbred horse race. The race took place on May 15, 1982, and was televised in the United States on the ABC television network. Aloma's Ruler, who was jockeyed by Jack Kaenel, won the race by a half of a length over runner-up Linkage. Approximate post time was 5:41 p.m. Eastern Time. The race was run on a fast track in a final time of 1:55 2/5.  The Maryland Jockey Club reported total attendance of 80,724, this is recorded as second highest on the list of American thoroughbred racing top attended events for North America in 1982.

Payout 

The 107th Preakness Stakes Payout Schedule

$2 Exacta:  (7–6) paid   $30.40

The full chart 

 Winning Breeder: Silk Willoughby Farm; (FL)
 Times: 1/4 mile – 0:23 4/5; 1/2 mile – 0:48 flat; 3/4 mile – 1:12 flat; mile – 1:36 2/5; 1 3/16 (final) – 1:55 2/5
 Track Condition: Fast
 Total Attendance: 80,724

References

External links 

 

1982
Horse races in Maryland
May 1982 sports events in the United States
1982 in horse racing
1982 in sports in Maryland